Kiesimä is a medium-sized lake of Finland. It belongs in the Kymijoki main catchment area. It is located in the region Pohjois-Savo. The Kiesimä Canal connects the lake westwards to the lake Konnevesi and the Kerkonkoski Canal connects it eastwards to the lake Niinivesi.

References

See also
List of lakes in Finland

Lakes of Rautalampi